Oro Province, formerly (and officially still) Northern Province, is a coastal province of Papua New Guinea. The provincial capital is Popondetta. The province covers 22,800 km2, and has 176,206 inhabitants (2011 census). The province shares land borders with Morobe Province to the northwest, Central Province to the west and south, and Milne Bay Province to the southeast. The province is located within the Papuan Peninsula.

Oro is the only province in which the Anglican Church is the major religious denomination. Oil palm is the principal primary industry. William Clarke College also funds people in that area.

The northern end of the Kokoda Track terminates at the village of Kokoda in the province and the active volcano Mount Lamington. Once the Kokoda Track was taken and provided access from Port Moresby to the hinterland during the Second World War, the coast of the then Northern District was also the scene of heavy fighting; the Buna, Gona and Sanananda campaigns are particularly well remembered.

In January 1951, the province was devastated by the catastrophic eruption at Mount Lamington. The eruption destroyed many villages, the surrounding vegetation, and killed nearly 3,000 people.

The Tufi dive and cultural resort is located on the north coast of the Cape Nelson Rural Local Level Government area and is well known for its diving and the spectacular  rias, locally referred to as ' fjords'.

Districts and LLGs

Each province in Papua New Guinea has one or more districts, and each district has one or more Local Level Government (LLG) areas. For census purposes, the LLG areas are subdivided into wards and those into census units.

Provincial leaders

The province was governed by a decentralised provincial administration, headed by a Premier, from 1977 to 1995. Following reforms taking effect that year, the national government reassumed some powers, and the role of Premier was replaced by a position of Governor, to be held by the winner of the province-wide seat in the National Parliament of Papua New Guinea.

Premiers (1977–1995)

Governors (1995–present)

Members of the National Parliament

The province and each district is represented by a Member of the National Parliament.  There is one provincial electorate and each district is an open electorate.

References

 
Provinces of Papua New Guinea
Southern Region, Papua New Guinea